Wheelchair fencing at the 1980 Summer Paralympics consisted of seventeen events.

Medal summary

Men's events

Women's events

Mixed events

References 

 

1980 Summer Paralympics events
1980
Paralympics
International fencing competitions hosted by the Netherlands